Grete Ingeborg Nykkelmo (born 25 December 1961) is a former biathlete and cross-country skier from Norway. She competed in both events from 1982 to 1992.

She won four medals at the 1985 FIS Nordic World Ski Championships in Seefeld with a gold in the 20 km, a silver in the 4 × 5 km relay, and bronzes in the 5 km and 10 km. At the 1991 Biathlon World Championships in Lahti, she won a gold medal in the 7.5 km sprint and silvers in the 15 km individual and the 3 × 7.5 km relay.

In 1980 she became Norwegian champion in 10 km cross-country running, representing Selbu IL. On the same distance she won one silver medal (1981) and three bronze medals (1979, 1982, 1985).

Nykkelmo won the Egebergs Ærespris in 1990 for her top achievements and also won one additional cross-country skiing event in 20 km in 1986.

Cross-country skiing results
All results are sourced from the International Ski Federation (FIS).

World Championships
 4 medals – (1 gold, 1 silver, 2 bronze)

World Cup

Season standings

Individual podiums
2 victories 
9 podiums

Team podiums
 3 victories 
 5 podiums 

Note:   Until the 1999 World Championships, World Championship races were included in the World Cup scoring system.

References

External links
 IBU Profile
 

1961 births
Living people
Biathletes at the 1992 Winter Olympics
Olympic biathletes of Norway
Norwegian female biathletes
Norwegian female cross-country skiers
Norwegian female long-distance runners
Biathlon World Championships medalists
FIS Nordic World Ski Championships medalists in cross-country skiing
Sportspeople from Trondheim
20th-century Norwegian women